Daniel J. Watts (born July 24, 1982 in North Carolina) is an American actor. He received his BFA from the Elon University Musical Theatre Program in 2004. He has served as an artist-in-residence at Arizona State University.

Filmography

Film

Television

Theatre

Awards and nominations

References

External links 
 
 
 
 

1982 births
Living people
American male stage actors
American male musical theatre actors
American male television actors
American male film actors
Male actors from North Carolina
20th-century American male actors
21st-century American male actors
Elon University alumni